Hussey Crespigny Vivian, 3rd Baron Vivian,  (19 June 1834 – 21 October 1893) was a British diplomat from the Vivian family.

Background
Born at Connaught Place, London, Vivian was the eldest son of Charles Vivian, 2nd Baron Vivian, and was educated at Eton College.

Later diplomatic career
In 1873, Vivian was sent to Alexandria as Consul-General. In 1878, he was appointed to the Order of the Bath as a Companion (CB). He was sent to Bern as Minister Resident in 1879, and was promoted to Envoy Extraordinary and Minister Plenipotentiary to the Swiss Confederation in 1881. Few months later, he was transferred to Copenhagen, and in 1884 to Brussels, where he was appointed to the Order of St Michael and St George as a Knight Commander (KCMG) in the 1886 Birthday Honours. Having succeeded to his father's title in 1886, he was appointed to be a deputy lieutenant of the County of Cornwall in 1887. In the 1890 Birthday Honours, he was promoted in the Order of St Michael and St George to be a Knight Grand Cross (GCMG). His final and highest position was to Rome in 1892, where he remained until he died from pneumonia in 1893. He was sworn of the Privy Council on the year of his death. The Prince of Naples was present at his funeral.

Marriage and children
On 8 June 1876, Vivian married Louisa Duff and they had five children, including:

 George Crespigny Brabazon Vivian, 4th Baron Vivian (1878–1940)
 Hon Dorothy Maud Vivian (1879–1939), married Field Marshal Douglas Haig, 1st Earl Haig.
 Hon Alexandra Mary Freesia Vivian (1890–1963), married Charles Pelham, Lord Worsley.

References

Radford, E. L., rev. Matthew, H. C. G., Vivian, Hussey Crespigny, third Baron Vivian (1834–1893), diplomatist, Oxford Dictionary of National Biography

1834 births
1893 deaths
Barons in the Peerage of the United Kingdom
British consuls-general in Egypt
Companions of the Order of the Bath
Deaths from pneumonia in Lazio
Deputy Lieutenants of Cornwall
Diplomatic peers
Fellows of the Royal Geographical Society
Knights Grand Cross of the Order of St Michael and St George
People educated at Eton College
Ambassadors of the United Kingdom to Belgium
Ambassadors of the United Kingdom to Denmark
Ambassadors of the United Kingdom to Romania
Hussey
Members of the Privy Council of the United Kingdom
Eldest sons of British hereditary barons
Burials in the Protestant Cemetery, Rome